Yegor Igorevich Yegorov (born 16 November 1992) is a Russian football referee and a former defender.

Club career
He made his Russian Football National League debut for FC Nizhny Novgorod on 17 June 2011 in a game against FC Khimki.

Referee career
After retiring as a player, he started refereeing in 2014, and began to be assigned as main referee in the Russian Professional Football League games in the 2017–18 season.

Personal life
He is a son of Igor Egorov.

References

External links
 
 Profile by SportBox

1992 births
Sportspeople from Nizhny Novgorod
Living people
Russian footballers
Association football defenders
FC Nizhny Novgorod (2007) players
FC Khimik Dzerzhinsk players
Russian football referees